Wanted! is a 1937 British comedy film directed by George King and starring Zasu Pitts, Claude Dampier and Mark Daly. It was made at Shepperton Studios as a quota quickie.

Premise
The Oatfields, a married couple, are mistaken for jewel thieves and forced to go to a party.  The husband accidentally turns on the burglar alarm and the real criminals are apprehended.

Cast
 Zasu Pitts as Winnie Oatfield  
 Claude Dampier as Henry Oatfield  
 Mark Daly as Mr. Smithers  
 Norma Varden as Mrs. Smithers  
 Finlay Currie as Uncle Mart  
 Kathleen Harrison as Belinda  
 Billy Holland as Harry the Hick  
 Stella Bonheur as Baby Face  
 Billy Bray as Sparrow Hawkins  
 Arthur Goullet as Bonelli  
 Alfred Wellesley as Lord Hotbury  
 Mabel Twemlow as Lady Hotbury  
 D.J. Williams as Captain McTurk  
 Bryan Herbert as Police Constable Gribble

References

Bibliography
 Chibnall, Steve. Quota Quickies: The Birth of the British 'B' Film. British Film Institute, 2007.
 Low, Rachael. Filmmaking in 1930s Britain. George Allen & Unwin, 1985.
 Wood, Linda. British Films, 1927-1939. British Film Institute, 1986.

External links

1937 films
British comedy films
1937 comedy films
Films directed by George King
Quota quickies
Films shot at Shepperton Studios
Films set in England
British black-and-white films
1930s English-language films
1930s British films